Goblin Slayer is a Japanese dark fantasy light novel series written by Kumo Kagyu and illustrated by Noboru Kannatuki. A manga adaptation by Kōsuke Kurose is serialized in the Monthly Big Gangan magazine, and a second adaptation by Masahiro Ikeno runs in the same magazine. A prequel manga by Kento Eida runs in Young Gangan.  Both the novels and the manga adaptations have been licensed by North American publisher Yen Press. Three audio drama CDs have been released, bundled with the fourth, sixth, seventh, and eighth light novels.

Light novels
The light novels are written by Kumo Kagyu and illustrated by Noboru Kannatsuki.  The series was originally published online. SB Creative published the first volume under their GA Bunko imprint on February 15, 2016. Sixteen volumes have been released in Japan so far.

A spinoff novel written by Kagyu and illustrated by Shingo Adachi, titled , was published in March 2018. A prequel series that reveals Goblin Slayer's past and the events that led him to become an adventurer with the sole purpose of exterminating all goblins from the world.

Kagyu will launch a new spinoff, titled , in the Gangan GA online magazine.  The series will run for nine chapters.

The fourth volume of the light novel included an original audio drama CD written by Kagyu, as did the sixth, seventh, and eighth volumes.

Yen Press licensed the novels for publication in North America, and released the first volume in English on December 20, 2016.  Yen Press has also licensed the Goblin Slayer Side Story: Year One spinoff.

Goblin Slayer

Side stories

Goblin Slayer Side Story: Year One

Goblin Slayer Side Story II: Dai Katana

Manga
A manga adaptation by Kōsuke Kurose began serialization in the June 2016 issue of Square Enix's seinen manga magazine Monthly Big Gangan on May 25, 2016.  Yen Press licensed the series at the same time as the light novels, and are simulpublishing the chapters in English as they are released in Japan.

Artist Kento Eida launched a prequel manga, titled Goblin Slayer Side Story: Year One, in Square Enix's seinen magazine Young Gangan on September 15, 2017.  As with the main manga, the prequel is simulpublished by Yen Press.

A second adaptation of the main story, this one titled Goblin Slayer: Brand New Day and illustrated by Masahiro Ikeno, began serialization on Square Enix's Monthly Big Gangan on May 25, 2018.  The story adapts the light novels starting with volume four.  Yen Press is also simulpublishing Brand New Day. The story follows the lives of the many other characters the main series' protagonists have encountered throughout their adventures, providing background on minor characters which further explores the world that Goblin Slayer takes place in.

Takashi Minakuchi will launch a manga adaptation of the Tsubanari no Daikatana novel on Square Enix's Manga Up! app and on the Gangan GA website.

Goblin Slayer

Chapters not yet in tankōbon format
These chapters have yet to be published in a tankōbon volume:

"Chapter 73"
"Chapter 74"
"Chapter 75"
"Chapter 76"
"Chapter 77"
"Chapter 78"

Goblin Slayer Side Story: Year One

Chapters not yet in tankōbon format
The following chapters were serialized in Young Gangan and published digitally by Yen Press, but have not yet been collected into a volume:

"Chapter 71"
"Chapter 72"
"Chapter 73"
"Chapter 74"
"Chapter 75"
"Chapter 76"
"Chapter 77"
"Chapter 78"
"Chapter 79"
"Chapter 80"
"Chapter 81"
"Chapter 82"

Goblin Slayer Side Story II: Dai Katana

Goblin Slayer: Brand New Day

See also
 List of Goblin Slayer episodes

References

External links
  at GA Bunko 
  at Monthly Big Gangan 
 
 

Goblin Slayer
Goblin Slayer